The Old Turrell City Hall is a historic government building at 160 Eureka Street in Turrell, Arkansas.  Built c. 1955, it is a classic example of a Quonset Hut, a form popularized during World War II for military uses.  It has corrugated metal walls and ceiling, and is set on a concrete foundation.  Its main facade, in one of the vertical ends, has a centrally-positioned garage door, with a sash window to the left, and a pedestrian entrance to the right.  The building was used as city hall until 1968, when the present hall was built.

The building was listed on the National Register of Historic Places in 2007.

See also
National Register of Historic Places listings in Crittenden County, Arkansas

References

City and town halls on the National Register of Historic Places in Arkansas
Buildings and structures completed in 1955
Buildings and structures in Crittenden County, Arkansas
City halls in Arkansas
National Register of Historic Places in Crittenden County, Arkansas
1955 establishments in Arkansas